Florence Williams, known as 'Flo', (born 27 October 1994) is a Wales rugby union player. She plays fly-half for Wales and for Wasps Ladies Rugby Club. She made her international debut at the 2021 Women's Six Nations Championship.

Club career 
Williams began her rugby career with Aylesford Bulls as fly-half and scrum-half. She later went on to play centre and fly-half for Lichfield, and later Loughborough Lightning, before joining the Wasps in 2018.

International career 
Williams made her international debut at the 2021 Women's Six Nations Championships, playing fly-half for Wales.

Personal life 
Williams was born in Chatham, Kent, in 1994 to an English mother and Welsh father. At age eight, she joined the Aylesford Bulls where she played for 12 years.

She attended Maidstone Grammar School and later Loughborough University, where she graduated in 2017 with a 2.1 degree in graphic communications.

In 2019, Williams launched the Perception Agency which aims to build the profile of women's sport through marketing, consultancy, partnerships and branding.

In August 2020, Williams took to Twitter to highlight the disparity between the marketing material for Ireland Rugby's men's and women's sports kit. While the press shots for the men's kit featured players from the team, the images depicting the women's kit featured nameless models. Williams' tweet went viral, prompting a massive online movement among female rugby players under the hashtag #IAmEnough.

In January 2021, Williams appeared on the podcast Performance Hackers, discussing the perception of women's sport and advocating for positive change.

References

External links 
Official website

1994 births
Welsh female rugby union players
Female rugby union players
Living people